Manang Airport  is a domestic airport located in Manang  serving Manang District, a district in Gandaki Province in Nepal.

History
The airport started operations on 28 February 1981. In 2015, the airport was renovated and the runway was blacktopped.

Facilities

Airlines and destinations

Since 2012, there are no scheduled services to and from Manang Airport. Previously Nepal Airlines and Tara Air operated routes to Pokhara.

References

External links
 

Airports in Nepal
Airport
1981 establishments in Nepal